Jack is the first novel by Swedish writer, composer and musician Ulf Lundell, published in 1976.

References

1976 Swedish novels
Swedish-language novels
Novels set in Stockholm
Novels set in Gotland
1976 debut novels